This list comprises all players who have participated in at least one league match for C.D. Atlético Marte since the club's creation in 1950. Players who were on the roster but never appeared in a game are not listed.

A "†" denotes players who only appeared in a single match.

A
  Agustin Adorni
  Jose Luis Alvarado
  Ernesto Aparicio

B
  Rodolfo Baello
  Fernando Barrios "el Gato"
  Suarez Becerra
   Ricardo Bellancanzone
  Danilo Blanco
  Carlos Castro Borja

C
  Salvador Cabezas
  Jorge Salomón Campos 
  Milton Campos
  Carlos Felipe Cañadas
  Manuel Cañadas
  Santana Cartagena
  Adonay Castillo
  Agustin Castillo
  Giovani Delgado Castillo
  Guillermo Castro
  Ramiro Cepeda
  Roberto Clemente
  Luis Cesar Condomi
  Abdul Thompson Conteh
  Santiago Cortes

D
  Miguel Angel Diaz

E
  Nelson Escobar
  Cristian Esnal
  Raul Esnal

F
  Ramon Fagoaga
   Alberto Fay
  Francisco Francés "Paco" 
  Elenilson Franco
  Juan Fullana

G
  Manuel Garay "Tamalón"
  Francisco Garcia
  Ernesto Gochez
  Mauricio Gonzalez Pachin
  Miguel González

H
  Ivan Castro Herrrera
  Norberto Huezo
  Wilfredo Huezo "el doctorcito"

I
  José Antonio Infantozzi "Tolín"
  Wilfredo Iraheta

J
  Odir Jacques

L
  Armando Larín
  Alejandro Larrea
  Gustavo Lucha "el Bordador"

M
  Raúl Magaña
  Deogracias Abaga Edu Mangue
  Roberto Garcia Maradiaga
  Rodinei Martins
  Gonzalo Mazzía
  Julio César Mejía "Muñeca" 
  Oscar Mejia
  Carlos Meléndez
  Sergio Mendez
  Conrado Miranda
  Antonio Montes
  Luis Guevara Mora
  Roberto Morales

N
   Nildeson

O
  Andres Ortega
  Marcelo Ospina

P
  Anibal Parada 
  Carlos Parra 
   Emiliano Pedrozo 
  Jorge Pena
  Fabricio Perez 
  Juan Bautista Perez
  Mauricio Perla
  Geronimo Pericullo
  René Pimentel
  Andres Puig

Q
  Mario Pablo Quintanilla
  José Quintanilla

R
  Guillermo Ragazzone
  Danis Cristopher Ramírez
  Manuel Ramos
  Jose Maria Rivas
  Roberto Rivas
  Alfredo Rivera
  Luis Antonio Regalado "Loco"
  Ramon Rodriguez
  Francisco Roque
  William Rosales "el Pony"
  José Luis Rugamas
  Rutilio Rivera

S
  Dennis Salinas
  Ricardo Sepulveda
  Nicolas Suazo

T
  
  Luis Ernesto Tapia
  Irineo Nunez Torres
  Marcial Turcios

U
  Gabriel Urriola

V
  Francisco Vargas
  Raul Pibe Vasquez
  Alberto Villalta
  Fernando Villalta
  Mario Figueroa Viscarret

Z
  Luis Ramirez Zapata

External links
 

Atlético Marte
C.D. Atlético Marte footballers
Lists of association football players by club
Association football player non-biographical articles